Snowmass (sometimes known locally as Old Snowmass) is an unincorporated community and a U.S. Post Office located in Pitkin County, Colorado, United States.  It is situated in the valley of the Roaring Fork River, near the mouth of Snowmass Creek along State Highway 82 between Aspen and Basalt.  It consists largely of a post office, several commercial businesses, and surrounding houses and ranches.  The Snowmass Post Office has the ZIP Code 81654.

Snowmass should not be confused with the Snowmass Ski Area or with the Town of Snowmass Village, the location of the ski area.

History
Ken Lay, the former CEO of Enron, died near Snowmass on July 5, 2006.

Geography
Snowmass is located at  (39.330845,-106.985035).

Economy
Aspen Camp of the Deaf and Hard of Hearing, one of the oldest non-profits in the valley and the only year-round camp in the world for the Deaf, is located in Snowmass.

St. Benedict's Monastery, of the Order of Cistercians of the Strict Observance (Trappist), is located in Snowmass.

See also

Colorado
Outline of Colorado
Index of Colorado-related articles
Bibliography of Colorado
Geography of Colorado
History of Colorado
Colorado statistical areas
Glenwood Springs, CO Micropolitan Statistical Area
List of counties in Colorado
Pitkin County, Colorado
List of places in Colorado
List of census-designated places in Colorado
List of forts in Colorado
List of ghost towns in Colorado
List of mountain passes in Colorado
List of mountain peaks of Colorado
List of municipalities in Colorado
List of post offices in Colorado
Protected areas of Colorado

References

External links
 Snowmass Restaurant Guide
 Snowmass City Guide

Unincorporated communities in Pitkin County, Colorado
Unincorporated communities in Colorado